Katanosins are a group of antibiotics (also known as lysobactins). They are natural products with strong antibacterial potency. So far,  katanosin A and katanosin B (lysobactin) have been described.

Sources
Katanosins have been isolated from the fermentation broth of  microorganisms, such as Cytophaga. or the  Gram-negative bacterium Lysobacter sp.

Structure
Katanosins are cyclic depsipeptides (acylcyclodepsipeptides). These non-proteinogenic structures are not regular proteins from primary metabolism. Rather, they originate from bacterial secondary metabolism. Accordingly, various non-proteinogenic (non-ribosomal) amino acids are found in katanosins, such as 3-hydroxyleucine, 3-hydroxyasparagine, allothreonine and 3-hydroxyphenylalanine. All katanosins have a cyclic and a linear segment (“lariat structure”). The peptidic ring is closed with an ester bond (lactone).

Katanosin A and B differ in the amino acid position 7. The minor metabolite katanosin A has a valine in this position, whereas the main metabolite katanosin B carries an isoleucine.

Biological activity
Katanosin antibiotics target the bacterial cell wall biosynthesis. They are highly potent against problematic Gram-positive hospital pathogens such as staphylococci and enterococci. Their promising biological activity attracted various biological and chemical research groups. Their in-vitro potency is comparable with the current “last defence” antibiotic vancomycin.

Chemical synthesis
The first total syntheses of katanosin B (lysobactin) have been described in 2007.

References

Antibiotics
Depsipeptides